The Ambassador of the Republic of the Philippines to Lebanon (: safir alfilibiyn ladaa aljumhuriat allubnania) is the Republic of the Philippines' foremost diplomatic representative in the Republic of Lebanon. As head of the Philippines' diplomatic mission there, the Ambassador is the official representative of the President and the Government of the Philippines to the President and Government of Lebanon. The position has the rank and status of an Ambassador Extraordinary and Plenipotentiary.

List of representatives

Honorary Consuls and Consuls-General

Ambassadors

See also 
 List of diplomatic missions of the Philippines

Notes and References

External links
 

 
Lebanon
Philippines